Stuart Peter Ridge (born 23 November 1961) is a former English cricketer.  Ridge was a right-handed batsman who bowled right-arm medium pace.  He was born in Beaconsfield, Buckinghamshire.

Ridge made his debut for Buckinghamshire in the 1980 Minor Counties Championship against Oxfordshire.  He played Minor counties cricket for Buckinghamshire from 1980 to 1982, making 5 appearances.

In 1981, he made his first-class debut for Oxford University against Leicestershire.  He played 10 further first-class matches for the University, the last coming against Cambridge University in 1982.  In his 11 first-class matches for the University, he scored 71 runs at a batting average of 7.88, with a highest score of 22.  With the ball he took 14 wickets at a bowling average of 63.85, with best figures of 4/128.

References

External links
Stuart Ridge at ESPNcricinfo
Stuart Ridge at CricketArchive

1961 births
Living people
People from Beaconsfield
English cricketers
Buckinghamshire cricketers
Oxford University cricketers
Alumni of Worcester College, Oxford